Beyene Petros is a professor of Biology at Addis Ababa University and a former  member of the Ethiopian House of People's Representatives, representing an electoral district in Badawacho of Hadiya Zone. He is currently the chairman of one of the largest opposition political parties in Ethiopia, the Ethiopian Federal Democratic Forum Medrek.

Personal life 
Beyene was born on March 11, 1950, in Hadiya, Ethiopia. He attended elementary and high school at local schools in southern Ethiopia. He received his BSc from Addis Ababa University, MS from University of Wisconsin and Ph.D. from Tulane University all in Biology. 
Beyne joined the staff of Addis Ababa University in 1979 when he became a Lecturer. Later he became a Professor of Biology in 2009.

Political career
Beyene joined politics in 1991 when the ruling EPRDF took power. He was then appointed deputy minister of Education but later resigned from government. He has been a major opposition political figure since 1995. Beyene was first elected to the parliament as member for Shone constituency in the May 2000 elections. In the 2003 parliament, he served as chairman for the combined Council of Alternative Forces for Peace and Democracy in Ethiopia, the Southern Ethiopia Peoples' Democratic Coalition, and the Hadiya National Democratic Organization. When parties joined to form the United Ethiopian Democratic Forces (UEDF) in 2004, Prof. Beyene became the chairman of the UEDF. He by now is serving as chairman for Ethiopian Federal Democratic Forum (Medrek).

On 3 August 2018, Beyene was promoted to the new Government Privatisation Advisory Council to advise Prime Minister Abiy Ahmed concerning his new economic reforms.

References

External links
"Worrying Past, Bleak Year Ahead", essay by Beyene Petros (Addis Fortune website)
"ETHIOPIA: Interview with opposition MP Beyene Petros" IRIN interview from 2002

Family
Beyene Patros is married and has four children, two girls and two boys.

1950 births
Academic staff of Addis Ababa University
Members of the House of Peoples' Representatives
Living people
Ethiopian biologists
United Ethiopian Democratic Forces politicians
Medrek politicians